Thomas de Multon (died 1322), Lord of Egremont, was an English noble.

He was the eldest son of Thomas de Multon of Egremont and Emoine Le Boteler. Thomas was summoned to parliament as Baron Multon of Egremont, between 1297 and 1320, being engaged in the wars with Scotland.

Marriage and issue
He married Eleanor, daughter of Richard de Burgh, Earl of Ulster and Margaret, they are known to have had the following issue:
John de Multon, died without issue
Joan de Multon, married Robert FitzWalter, the son of Robert FitzWalter, 1st Baron FitzWalter, had issue.
Elizabeth de Multon, married firstly Robert Harington, with issue and secondly Walter de Bermingham.
Margaret de Multon, married Thomas de Luci.

References

1322 deaths
13th-century English people
14th-century English people

Year of birth unknown